Ana Julia Herrera Isasi (born 1966) is a Navarrese politician, Minister of Culture, Sports and Youth of Navarre from July 2015 to August 2019.

References

1966 births
Government ministers of Navarre
Geroa Bai politicians
Living people
Politicians from Navarre